Wyoming Fuel Company, an Early Commercial-style warehouse at 720 W. 18th St. in Cheyenne, Wyoming, was built in 1929, with an addition added in 1937.  It was listed on the National Register of Historic Places in 2003.

It was designed by William Dubois.

References

Commercial buildings on the National Register of Historic Places in Wyoming
Early Commercial architecture in the United States
Buildings and structures completed in 1929
Laramie County, Wyoming
Warehouses on the National Register of Historic Places